Częstochowa Voivodeship was a unit of administrative division and local government in Poland in years 1975–1998, superseded mainly by Silesian Voivodeship, with a few eastern gminas attached to the freshly created Świętokrzyskie Voivodeship. Though most of the current territory of the former Częstochowa Voivodeship belongs to the Silesian Voivodeship, it historically is part of Lesser Poland, apart from western areas, around Lubliniec and Olesno.

Capital city: Częstochowa

Major cities and towns: (population in 1995):
 Częstochowa (259,500);
 Myszków (34,000);
 Lubliniec (26,900).

See also:
 Voivodeships of Poland

Former voivodeships of Poland (1975–1998)
History of Łódź Voivodeship
History of Częstochowa